Kuchipudi Latha Praveen is an Indian film editor, based in Chennai, who works predominantly in Tamil, Telugu, Hindi, Malayalam and English films. He is a recipient of one National Film Award, one Tamizh Nadu State Film Award among others. He has edited over 100 films across different languages so far.

Career
Praveen started his part-time video editing career and has worked along with his father in Production department of Eenadu Television. Praveen has done video editing for ETV Network's Telugu News and soap opera's like Anweshitha.

After working under Balu Mahendra for his television series, Kadhai Neram, he shifted to feature films and has mostly worked together with N. B. Srikanth on several successful Tamil films, most notably for Venkat Prabhu's directorials. He has completed 100 films so far in four languages. He is based in Chennai and Singapore. The duo won the Tamil Nadu State Film Award for Best Editor in 2008 for Saroja. He also won National Film Award for Best Editing for his work in the Tamil film Aaranya Kaandam (2011).

Filmography

References

External links
 

Film editors from Andhra Pradesh
1977 births
Living people
Best Editor National Film Award winners
Tamil film editors
Telugu film editors